Terence Bradley Gibson (born 23 December 1962) is an English former professional footballer who played as a forward for several clubs, including Tottenham Hotspur, Coventry City, Manchester United and Wimbledon.

Playing career
Born in Walthamstow, Gibson was educated at Highams Park School in Highams Park, London. He started his career at Tottenham Hotspur, making his first team debut at the age of 17 years and 6 days, before moving to Coventry City in 1983. In 1981, he was loaned out to the Swedish team GAIS, who in that time played in the Swedish second division.

At Coventry, his impressive tally of 52 goals in just over 100 appearances (including a hat-trick in Coventry's 4-0 league win over Liverpool at Highfield Road in December 1983) earned him a high-profile transfer to Manchester United in January 1986. His arrival came when Mark Hughes was in the process of agreeing a transfer to FC Barcelona of Spain for the end of the season, and manager Ron Atkinson was looking to buy a new striker. However, with Hughes not leaving until the close season and his strike partner Frank Stapleton staying put, Gibson spent most of his time on the bench and his chances of first team action barely improved even when Hughes left as Atkinson had since signed striker Peter Davenport. United had been top of the league when Gibson had joined them but a disappointing second half of the season saw them drop down to fourth place, and Atkinson was sacked in early November following a poor start to the 1986–87 season. His successor Alex Ferguson did not appear to want to keep Gibson at United, and with the arrival of Brian McClair in the 1987 close season Gibson left Old Trafford after just 18 months.

He later was a part of the Wimbledon team that won the 1988 FA Cup Final against Liverpool. Other clubs include Swindon Town, Peterborough United and Barnet as player coach alongside Ray Clemence, while he also had brief stints as a trialist with Charlton Athletic and as a non-contract player with Tottenham, but did not play in either club's first team during those spells.

Post-playing career
Gibson had spells as youth team coach and caretaker manager at Barnet after retiring from playing in 1995. He was also coach of the Northern Ireland national team, assisting his former Wimbledon teammate Lawrie Sanchez to victories over England, Spain and Sweden among others. Prior to this he was assistant manager at Wycombe Wanderers, also working alongside Sanchez where together they guided the third-tier team to the FA Cup semi-finals in 2001 where they were narrowly defeated 2–1 by Liverpool. He was also appointed as coach of Premier League club Fulham in April 2007 assisting in the survival of the club in the Premier League. Gibson left the club after the departure of Sanchez in December 2007.

He works as a co-commentator on Sky Sports' coverage of Spanish football. Gibson gained extensive experience of Spanish football while working as a scout for Premier League clubs Bolton Wanderers and Manchester City. He combined this role with coaching Northern Ireland and was based in Southern Spain.

Personal life
Gibson is married to Paula and they have two children. He is a Tottenham Hotspur fan, having played for them in the early part of his career.

Honours
Wimbledon
FA Cup: 1987–88

References

External links
Profile at StretfordEnd.co.uk

1962 births
Living people
Association football forwards
English footballers
Tottenham Hotspur F.C. players
Coventry City F.C. players
Wimbledon F.C. players
Manchester United F.C. players
Swindon Town F.C. players
Peterborough United F.C. players
Barnet F.C. players
People from Walthamstow
Bolton Wanderers F.C. non-playing staff
Manchester City F.C. non-playing staff
Fulham F.C. non-playing staff
English Football League players
Premier League players
FA Cup Final players